Anne Mackintosh (1723–1784) was a Scottish Jacobite of the Clan Farquharson, a Scottish clan of the Scottish Highlands and also the wife of Angus Mackintosh, chief of the Clan Mackintosh. She was the only female military leader during the Jacobite rising of 1745 and the first female to hold the rank of colonel in Scotland.

Early life
Born Anne Farquharson in Aberdeenshire in 1723, Mackintosh she was daughter of John Farquharson of Invercauld, chief of the Clan Farquharson and his wife, Margaret Murray. The family were Jacobite sympathisers. Around 1741 she was married to Angus (or Aeneas) Mackintosh, chief of the Clan Mackintosh, a strong anti-Jacobite family.

Jacobite rising of 1745
Early in 1744 Angus Mackintosh was offered one of three new Independent Companies being raised by John Campbell, 4th Earl of Loudoun to support the British-Hanoverian Government. Anne, dressed in male attire, rode around the glens and, in a very short time, enlisted 97 of the 100 men required for the captaincy. During the Jacobite rising of 1745, Angus' company fought for Lord Loudon's Government forces, aka. the Black Watch, in the Highlands.

When the Jacobite Prince Charles Edward Stuart landed in Scotland in 1745, Mackintosh, then 22 years old, forcefully raised between 200 and 400 men from Clan Mackintosh and the confederation of Clan Chattan for the Prince. As women could not command in the field, the regiment was placed under the command of Alexander MacGillivray the chief of the Clan MacGillivray, a member of the confederation. 'Colonel' Anne's regiment joined the Prince's army at Bannockburn, near Stirling Castle, in January 1746, 12 days before the Battle of Falkirk Muir.

A month later the Prince was staying at Moy Hall, Mackintosh's home. She received a message from her mother-in-law that 1,500 of Lord Loudon's men, including her husband's company stationed 8–12 miles away at Inverness, were planning a night raid on Moy Hall to snatch the Prince (and claim the £30,000 bounty). Mackintosh sent five of her staff out with guns to crash about and shout clan battle cries to trick the Government forces into thinking they were about to face the entire Jacobite army. The ploy worked and the Government force fled. The event became known as The Rout of Moy.

The next month Mackintosh's husband, who supported the Government and 300 of Loudon's men were captured north of Inverness by the Jacobites. The Prince paroled Captain Mackintosh into the custody of his wife, commenting "he could not be in better security, or more honourably treated". She famously greeted him with the words, "Your servant, captain" to which he replied, "your servant, colonel" thereby giving her the nickname "Colonel Anne". She was also called "La Belle Rebelle" (the beautiful rebel) by the Prince himself.

A high number of her men, pariculary the Clan Chattan men, and Alexander MacGillivray, were killed at the Battle of Culloden on 16 April 1746. Their grave is marked by the Well of the Dead on the battlefield. After the Jacobite defeat at the Battle of Culloden, Mackintosh was arrested and turned over to the care of her mother-in-law for a time. She stepped in to stop Anne McKay, a local Inverness woman who helped Jacobite officer Robert Nairn escape, being whipped through the streets of Inverness. Mackintosh later met Prince William, Duke of Cumberland at a social event in London with her husband. He asked her to dance to a pro-Government tune and she returned the favour by asking him to dance to a Jacobite tune.

Mackintosh died on 2 Mar 1787 in Leith, the harbour district of Edinburgh. She is buried in Old North Leith Burial Ground on Coburg Street. Her grave is marked by a white Jacobite rose and a commemorative plaque.

Historical fiction
Scottish author Janet Paisley has written a novel based on MacKintosh's exploits, "White Rose Rebel", published 2007.
Author Marsha Canham has also written an historical romance novel based on MacKintosh's exploits, "Midnight Honor"; book three of a trilogy regarding the Jacobite rising preceded by "The Blood of Roses" and "The Pride of Lions".
Portuguese author Hélia Correia has written the historical novel "Lillias Fraser", set in Scotland and Portugal between 1746 and 1762, in which  MacKintosh is a secondary character.

See also 

 Anne McKay (fl. 1740s - 1750s).

References 

Anderson, William, The Scottish Nation; or the Surnames, Families, Literature, Honours, and Biographical History of the People of Scotland, Vol. II of 3 volumes, A. Fullerton & Co., London, 1863
Bain, Robert, The Clans & Tartans of Scotland, William Collins Sons, London, 1938/1982.
Barthorp, Michael, The Jacobite Rebellions 1689-1745, Men-At-Arms Series #118, Osprey Publishing, London, 1982. 
Walter Biggar Blaikie, Itinerary of Prince Charles Edward Stuart . . ., Scottish Academic Press, Edinburgh, 1975.  First published 1897. 
Craig, Maggie, Damn Rebel Bitches: the Women of the 45, Mainstream, 1997. 
Hook, Michael and Ross, Walter, The ‘Forty-Five: the Last Jacobite Rebellion, The National Library of Scotland, HMSO, 1995. 
Keay, John & Julia, editors, Collins Encyclopedia of Scotland, HarperCollins Publishers, London, 1994. 
Lemnan, Bruce, The Jacobite Clans of the Great Glen 1650-1784, Methuen London Ltd., London, 1984.  
Livingstone, Alastair of Bachuil, Aikman, Christian W. H. and Hart, Betty Stuart, editors, Muster Roll of Prince Charles Edward Stuart's Army 1745-46, Aberdeen University Press, 1985. 
McLynn, Frank, The Jacobites, Routledge & Kegan Paul, London, 1985.
Moncreiffe, Sir Iain of that ilk, and Pottinger, Don, Scotland of Old, Clan Names Map, Bartholomew, Edinburgh, 1983.  
Scott-Moncrieff, Leslie, editor, The ‘45, to Gather an Image Whole, The Mercat Press, Edinburgh, 1988.  Chapter 10 "Jacobites at Heart:

Women in 18th-century warfare
Scottish Jacobites
People of the Jacobite rising of 1745
Women in European warfare